The Journal of Consumer Psychology is a quarterly peer-reviewed academic journal covering psychology as it relates to consumer behavior. It was established in 1992 and is published by John Wiley & Sons on behalf of the Society for Consumer Psychology, the 23rd division of the American Psychological Association. The editor-in-chief is Lauren Goldberg Block (Baruch College). According to the Journal Citation Reports, the journal has a 2016 impact factor of 3.385.

References

External links

Psychology journals
Elsevier academic journals
Publications established in 1992
Quarterly journals
English-language journals
Consumer behaviour
American Psychological Association academic journals